Hans Brandner (born 19 February 1949 in Berchtesgaden, Bavaria) is a German former luger who competed for West Germany from the early 1970s to the early 1980s. Competing in three Winter Olympics, He won the silver medal in the men's doubles event at Innsbruck in 1976.

Brandner also won two medals at the men's doubles event at the FIL World Luge Championships with a gold in 1979 and a bronze in 1977. He also won four medals in the men's doubles event at the FIL European Luge Championships with one gold (1977), one silver (1972), and two bronzes (1973, 1980).

Brandner's best overall finish in the men's doubles Luge World Cup was second in the inaugural 1977-8 season.

Later he managed with his wife the  "Hochkalter" hotel (named after the nearby Hochkalter mountains) in Ramsau near Berchtesgaden.

References

 Hotel Hochkalter 

1949 births
Living people
People from Berchtesgaden
Sportspeople from Upper Bavaria
German male lugers
Lugers at the 1972 Winter Olympics
Lugers at the 1976 Winter Olympics
Lugers at the 1980 Winter Olympics
Olympic silver medalists for West Germany
Olympic medalists in luge
Medalists at the 1976 Winter Olympics